Pio Iowane Wong is a Fijian politician of Fijian and Chinese descent.  He served in the Cabinet from 2004 to 2006 as Minister for Local Government, Housing, Squatter Settlement, and the Environment.

In the election held in September 2001, Wong, a former Army officer with the rank of colonel, won the Serua Navosa Open Constituency for the Soqosoqo Duavata ni Lewenivanua (SDL), defeating Adi Kuini Speed, who had held the seat for many years.  (Wong had previously contested the seat, unsuccessfully, as an independent candidate in the parliamentary election of 1999).  He was appointed Minister for Local Government, Housing, Squatter Settlement, and Environment in 2004.

The SDL did not nominate Wong for another Parliamentary term. He stood as independent candidate in the 2006 general election and was defeated.

References

Year of birth missing (living people)
Living people
Fijian people of Chinese descent
People educated at Marist Brothers High School, Fiji
I-Taukei Fijian members of the House of Representatives (Fiji)
Fijian soldiers
Government ministers of Fiji
Soqosoqo Duavata ni Lewenivanua politicians
Fijian people of I-Taukei Fijian descent
Ethnic minority members of the House of Representatives (Fiji)
Politicians from Nadroga-Navosa Province